In mathematics, the Neumann polynomials, introduced by Carl Neumann for the special case , are a sequence of polynomials in  used to expand functions in term of Bessel functions.

The first few polynomials are

A general form for the polynomial is

and they have the "generating function" 

where J are Bessel functions.

To expand a function f in the form 

Examples
An example is the extension

or the more general Sonine formula

where  is Gegenbauer's polynomial. Then,

the confluent hypergeometric function

and in particular

the index shift formula

the Taylor expansion (addition formula)

(cf.) and the expansion of the integral of the Bessel function,

are of the same type.

See also
Bessel function
Bessel polynomial
Lommel polynomial
Hankel transform
Fourier–Bessel series
Schläfli-polynomial

Notes 

Polynomials
Special functions